VCR is an American punk band with synthpop leanings. The band formed in November 2002 in Richmond, Virginia, with a relatively unique lineup of a drummer, a bassist, and three synthesizer players.

The band released their debut, self-titled EP on Richmond-based label Pop Faction in 2003. The release was limited to roughly 1000 copies. After no touring, the band was signed by SideOneDummy Records in 2005. The label re-released the band's debut EP with a slightly altered track listing that year. In 2006, the band released their first full-length album, Power Destiny.

In 2007 the band played their last show. In 2011 the Misfits Cassette was re-released on vinyl by Riot Style Records.

Lineup 
 Chad Middleton – vocals, synthesizer, sampler
 Stephen Smith – bass
 Mya Anitai – vocals, synthesizer
 Casey Tomlin – synthesizer
 Christian Newby – drums

Discography 
 VCR (EP) (2003, Pop Faction Records; Re-released in 2005 by SideOneDummy)
 Power Destiny (2006, SideOneDummy)
 Misfits Cassette Tape (2006, Ctrl+C Ctrl+V)

Featured on 
v/a – Atticus... Dragging the Lake 3 (2005, SideOneDummy) – VCR contributes "Bratcore" on track 16.
v/a – Warped Tour Compilation 2006 (2006, SideOneDummy) – VCR contributes "Do You Wanna Triumph?" on disc 1, track 19.

External links 
 VCR Bandcamp page

Music of Richmond, Virginia
Dance-punk musical groups
Musical groups from Virginia
Musical groups established in 2002
2002 establishments in Virginia